Cuauhtémoc Domínguez (born June 22, 1994, in Benito Juárez, Quintana Roo) is a Mexican professional footballer who last played for Pioneros de Cancún.

References

External links
 
 Cuauhtémoc Domínguez at Atlante F.C. Profile
 Cuauhtémoc Domínguez at Ascenso MX Profile
 
 

1994 births
Living people
Footballers from Quintana Roo
Mexican footballers
Atlante F.C. footballers
Pioneros de Cancún footballers
Ascenso MX players
Liga Premier de México players
Association football defenders